Rajendranath Zutshi, more commonly known as Raj Zutshi (born 4 February 1961), is an Indian film and television actor.

Personal life
Zutshi was born on 4 February 1961 in Srinagar, Jammu and Kashmir, India into a Kashmiri Pandit family. Raj Zutshi is a grandson of Dina Nath Zutshi, who was a radio and theatre artiste, perhaps best known to the public for his role as Halim Mirza, brother of Salim Mirza (Balraj Sahni), in the film Garam Hawa (1973).

Raj Zutshi was formerly married to Nuzhat Hussain, daughter of film-maker Nasir Hussain. He was her second husband and the step-father of actor Imran Khan, who was Nuzhat's son by her first husband, Anil Pal. Nuzhat is the sister of film-maker Mansoor Khan and the first cousin of actor Aamir Khan.

Career
Raj Zutshi also began his career as a theatre artist. He made the transition from theatre to cinema in 1984 with the film Holi. He was also seen in the TV series Yugantar in 1990, which was based on the novel of Sunil Gangopadhyay, and in the TV series Shikast (1997).

Filmography

Dubbing roles

Live action films

Awards and nominations

References

External links
 

Living people
Indian male film actors
Male actors in Hindi cinema
1961 births
Indian people of Kashmiri descent
Kashmiri people
Kashmiri Pandits
20th-century Indian male actors
21st-century Indian male actors